One Step Ahead is a song by American musician Jack Johnson. It was released on April 8, 2022, and is the lead single for his eighth studio album Meet the Moonlight.

Production 
Johnson worked on the song as well as the album with critically acclaimed producer and musician Blake Mills, who has worked with other artists such as Fiona Apple, Andrew Bird and Bob Dylan. When asked how Johnson connected with Mills, he stated “When Blake and I first got in touch we’d send each other playlists, and over time we realized we were drawn to music that sounds effortless despite all the effort put into making it. After a while we got a language together and I gained a trust in him that allowed me to let go, push outside my comfort zone, and get to a sound I really loved.” Most of the instruments in the song were performed by Johnson and Mills themselves, unlike Jack's previous record, All the Light Above It Too, where Johnson performed most of the instruments himself. Mixing and engineering was done by Joseph Lorge, who has worked with Mills on several projects, and with Phoebe Bridgers on her 2020 album Punisher. Recording and production for the album took place at EastWest and Sound City Studios in Los Angeles, as well as Johnson's home studio, The Mango Tree, in Hawaii.

Composition 
In a Rolling Stone interview, Johnson stated that the song is about how communication and how we receive information is so different nowadays with social media. The song is much heavier and includes more percussion than most other Johnson songs, however, the chorus slows down and is extremely quiet. Johnson says this represents the listener trying to find a calm realizing place to breath through the noise.

Release 
Johnson began teasing a new project on April 5, 2022, when he posted on his Instagram and Facebook accounts footage of him recording a in his studio. Later that week he shared a snippet of a new track, as well as the single cover for the song. On April 8, the song was released on all digital and streaming platforms, and was sent to adult alternative radio on April 11, 2022.

Music video 
Two videos for the song have been released on Johnson's official YouTube. On April 8, a lyric video by Morgan Maassen, Jeff Canham, Kat Studio & Gabrielle Saydee was released. On April 29, Johnson released a live video of the song, with him using a loop pedal and playing a Gibson ES-335 guitar.

Critical reception 
The song was received positively upon release, and many praised his new sound compared to his previous laid back style. Far Out Magazine stated that "The track also represents a real return to form for Johnson" and rated the song a 7.1 out of 10.

Chart performance 
The song debuted at number 21 on Billboard's Adult Alternative Airplay chart, becoming Johnson's 26th entry on the chart. On May 28, the song reached number 7, becoming Johnson's 19th top 10 song on the chart. On July 23, 2022, it reached number 1 on the chart, becoming Johnson's 11th number one song.

Charts

References 

2022 songs
2022 singles
Jack Johnson (musician) songs
Songs written by Jack Johnson (musician)